Mullen & Bluett was a Los Angeles-based department store specializing in men's clothing.

Founding
It was founded by Andrew Mullen and W. C. Bluett in the 1880s, at the corner of First and Spring streets in Downtown Los Angeles. Arthur R. Mullen took over management of the store after the death of the founders.

Broadway store

In 1910 the company rented the ground floor and basement of the Walter P. Story Building at Sixth and Broadway, at a time when all the major Los Angeles department stores (May Company California, The Broadway, Fifth Street Store/Walker's, Bullock's, J. W. Robinson's, Desmond's, etc.) had been establishing themselves on or adjacent to Broadway.

Miracle Mile branch

Architect Stiles O. Clements designed several Greater Los Angeles stores, and the one at 5570 Wilshire Boulevard on the Miracle Mile, Los Angeles as well as his adjacent Phelps-Terkel building at 5550 Wilshire, were considered landmarks by the Los Angeles Conservancy's Modern Committee. Nonetheless it was torn down in 2006, replaced with a large apartment complex in faux Art Deco design.

Expansion and Demise
In 1968, Mullen & Bluett had expanded to eleven stores including Hollywood, the Miracle Mile of Wilshire Boulevard, the Beverly Wilshire Hotel in Beverly Hills, Pasadena, South Coast Plaza in Orange County and Montclair Plaza in the Inland Empire.

In that same year, the chain was purchased by Grodins, a Northern California men's clothing retailer.

In 1972, Grodins exited the Southern California market, blaming the recession in 1970-71 and stock market weakness for the resulting inability to finance by IPO both its acquisition of Mullen & Bluett and its November 1969, $1 million new flagship store in San Francisco.

References

Defunct department stores based in Greater Los Angeles
Buildings and structures in Los Angeles
Mid-Wilshire, Los Angeles